Electric jackets are jackets which exhibit properties similar to those possessed by electric blankets. They are most commonly used by motorcycle riders when temperatures are low. They usually obtain power for their heating processes through a cord which can be plugged into the motorcycle's electric system. 

An additional socket is installed on the vehicle for that purpose, or if the vehicle has a mobile charger/cigarette lighter receptacle available, then the cord is directly plugged into that socket. Other electric jackets with self-contained power sources are in existence, and are useful for more portable situations where the vehicle's 12 volt supply is not available.

Uses
Uses include biking, skiing, hiking, hunting, fishing and spectator sports. The newer versions use lithium rechargeable batteries. The latest versions use lithium polymer batteries which have a high energy density and are relatively lightweight. 

Rechargeable battery-heated clothing, including electric jackets, is most useful for stop-start cold weather physical exertion activities. Electric jackets are now manufactured in Indian administrated Kashmir wherein product is new and thus has been patented under Indian Intellectual Property Law.

External links
Faux Leather Jackets

Jackets